Mannheim-Waldhof station is a railway station in the municipality of Mannheim, Baden-Württemberg, Germany.

Notable places nearby
Mannheim Harbour

References

Waldhof
Buildings and structures in Mannheim